The 2022 Formula Regional Japanese Championship was a multi-event, Formula Regional open-wheel single seater motor racing championship held in Japan. The drivers competed in Formula Regional cars that conform to the FIA Formula Regional regulations for the championship. This was the third season of the series promoted by K2 Planet.

The season started on 2 April at Fuji Speedway and ran over six weekends, until 11 December. Miki Koyama won the championship with three races to spare, becoming the first female driver to win an FIA-sanctioned Formula championship. Her team, Super License, won the teams' title. Gentleman driver "Hirobon", driving for Rn-sports, won the Masters' class.

Teams and drivers 
All teams and drivers competed using the Dome F111/3 Regional F3 car. All teams were Japanese-registered.

 Gentleman driver "Takumi" was supposed to compete for B-Max, but did not attend any rounds.

Race calendar and results 
A provisional calendar for the 2022 season was revealed on 25 November 2021, and was later revised to conclude in December.

Season summary

First half 
The 2022 season began in early April with nine cars at Fuji Speedway. Ryunosuke Sawa headed both qualifying sessions by half a second. Race one saw his closest opposition, front row starter Sota Ogawa, stall and drop back, leaving Sawa to claim the win ahead of Miki Koyama and Yoshiaki Katayama. The second race was held in wet conditions and was started under the safety car. Ogawa spun around during the safety car, and then multiple drivers had similar incidents as soon as the safety car was over. Sawa though held on to win again, with the rest of the podium the same as in race one. Race three did not offer much change: Sawa was once again the class of the field, gapping Ogawa and Koyama by over 20 seconds. His perfect weekend saw Sawa leave Fuji with a 24-point championship lead over Koyama.

Round two was held in Okayama, and this time Katayama was on top in qualifying. Race one saw Katayama turning his pole into a win ahead of Koyama and Ogawa, who had a slow start and ran into the gravel at turn one. This dropped him to seventh place, but he was able to recover to the podium. Koyama got a good start next to Katayama for race two, and so was able to overtake him into turn one. Katayama then also lost second place to Ogawa, but kept third place in the end. Race three saw Katayama have a slow start again, with Koyama and Ogawa benefitting from it again. The top three were the same as in race two. With Sawa dropping out of the championship, Koyama became the new leader in the standings, heading Katayama by 19 points. Ogawa was a further ten points behind in third.

The first half of the season came to an end at Motegi, where Koyama became the third triple-polesitter in as many rounds. She held the lead against Katayama and Ogawa in race one and kept them behind again when a safety car bunched up the field later on. Race two saw only four drivers reach the finish, as "Hirobon" did not start and Katayama collided with Takashi Hata and Yuki Tanaka. Koyama stayed clear of any incidents, winning again, ahead of debutant Kazuki Oki and gentleman driver Masaru Miura. The last race was a calmer affair, with Koyama once again converting pole into an unchallenged victory ahead of Ogawa and Katayama. Her perfect weekend saw her championship advantage grow to 59 points over Ogawa and Katayama, with the pair now neck on neck on 135 and 133 points respectively.

Second half 
Round four at Sportsland Sugo saw Ogawa, Oki and Koyama share poles in qualifying. Ogawa led race one from pole as Oki passed Koyama for second. The latter was promoted back to second when Oki then had to serve a drive-through penalty, but could not get back past Ogawa. The podium was completed by gentleman driver "Hirobon". Oki made the most of his race two pole, gapping Koyama and Ogawa at the start. Ogawa then overtook Koyama and closed up to Oki, but had to retire his car after fighting heavily for the lead. This promoted Katayama to the podium. Race three was controlled by Koyama who led from lights to flag, while Oki had a bad start that saw him get passed by Ogawa. Oki then dropped back further, allowing Riki Okusa to claim third. Koyama had the most consistent weekend of the top three, and so grew her advantage to 73 points.

The penultimate round of the season attracted 12 entries as it supported the 6 Hours of Fuji. The qualifying sessions were won by Koyama and Okusa, who then also got by Koyama at the start of race one. Koyama could not pass him, so she had to follow him home in second, with Katayama behind the pair. Race two saw another slow start by Koyama, she dropped back to third but was able to regain second place and then also take the lead from Okusa. The latter then struggled and dropped to third, behind Ogawa. Okusa had a technical problem on the first lap of race three, so he had to retire. This promoted Ogawa in the lead, which he held onto despite Koyama's best efforts to pass him. Katayama completed the podium. Koyama's race two victory saw her seal the championship title, with her lead now an unassailable 79 points ahead of the final round. 

The final round at Suzuka came three months later, and Oki and Ogawa shared poles for the two races. Oki was unable to benefit from his pole position, as he dropped to fourth after a bad start. His efforts to climb back up the order were curtailed when he crashed out on lap two. Ogawa managed his lead until the finish, with Koyama behind him and gentleman driver Takashi Hata completing the podium. Race two saw Oki get revenge for his bad start, as he went right by Ogawa at the race start and led uncontested until the chequered flag. Koyama had a quiet race to finish her perfect streak of 17 podiums in 17 races. Ogawa's second place in the standings was never in danger, as Katayama did not take part in the final round. Entry numbers were back down to single digits, as the championship continued its struggle to attract more drivers for a third year round.

Championship standings

Scoring system 
Points were awarded to the top ten drivers.

Drivers' championship

Masters class

Teams' standings 
Only the best finishing driver of each team was eligible for teams' championship points.

References

External links 

 

Formula Regional Japanese Championship
FRJC
Formula Regional